Edgar Willard Hiestand (December 3, 1888 – August 19, 1970) was an American businessman and politician.  A staunch anti-communist, he served ten years in the United States Congress.

Early life and education
He was born in Chicago, Illinois.

Hiestand was a 1910 graduate of Dartmouth College in Hanover, New Hampshire.

Career
A Republican and member of the John Birch Society, he represented California's 21st congressional district from 1953 until 1963, when he was defeated by Everett G. Burkhalter, a Burbank incumbent city councilman. The 21st district covered the northern 2/3 of Los Angeles County, including the cities of Pasadena and Sierra Madre on the east to Burbank and the San Fernando Valley on the west and the Antelope Valley (including Edwards Air Force Base) on the north. In 1962, the Democratic California Legislature re-districted Hiestand into the western section of the old 21st district, which was more heavily Democratic. Hiestand voted in favor of the Civil Rights Acts of 1957 and 1960, but voted against the 24th Amendment to the U.S. Constitution.

Hiestand served on the U.S. House Committee on Education and Labor where he sponsored and supported revisions to the business-labor statutes. He was an advisor to U.S. President Dwight D. Eisenhower on labor and management issues.

Prior to being elected to Congress, Hiestand engaged in a career of retailing, concluding with Sears, Roebuck and Co. in Glendale, California.

Death
Hiestand died, age 81, in Pasadena, California; his ashes were interred at San Gabriel Cemetery in California.

See also

 List of Dartmouth College alumni
 List of people from Chicago
 List of people from Pasadena, California
 List of United States representatives from California

References

1888 births
1970 deaths
20th-century American businesspeople
20th-century American politicians
American people of Swiss descent
Burials in California
Businesspeople from California
Businesspeople from Chicago
Dartmouth College alumni
Death in California
Illinois Republicans
John Birch Society members
Politicians from Chicago
Republican Party members of the United States House of Representatives from California
Old Right (United States)